Karacahisar can refer to the following places in Turkey:

 Karacahisar, Balya
 Karacahisar, Milas
 Karacahisar Castle
 Karaca Hisar